The Italy team for FIBA World Cup 2023 qualification will represent Italy at the 2023 FIBA Basketball World Cup.

Timeline
 31 August 2021: the draw is held in Switzerland and Italy goes in the Group H with Russia, Netherlands and Iceland.

First window
 10 November 2021: submitted the long list of 24 players.
 16 November 2021: submitted the list of 16 players.
 22 November 2021: Mannion and Totè are replaced with Flaccadori and Udom, for health reason.
 24 November 2021: submitted the final list of 12 players for the match against Russia.
 26 November 2021: Russia 92 – 78 Italy.
 24 November 2021: submitted the final list of 12 players for the match against Netherlands.

Kit 
Supplier: Spalding / Sponsor: Barilla

Roster 
The following 16 players were called by Matteo Sacchetti for the first window against Netherlands.

Depth chart

All Games 
These were the players that coach Sacchetti called for the qualification in the three windows.

Notes
   Age on November 29, 2021 

Legend

Staff 
After the EuroBasket 2022 qualification tournament the staff team was updated: Piero Bucchi, Paolo Galbiati and Riccardo Fois were hired as assistant coaches and replaced Massimo Maffezzoli and Paolo Conti. Only Emanuele Molin was confirmed amongst the assistant coaches.

Source:

Qualification 

Overview

First round, Group H 
The draw was held on 31 August 2021 in Mies, Switzerland. Italy was drawn into Group H with Russia, Netherlands and Iceland. These matches will be played in three windows from 26 to 29 November 2021, from 24 to 27 February 2022 and from 1 to 4 July 2022 with two games played by each team in every window.

@ Russia

vs Netherland

See also 
 2023 FIBA Basketball World Cup qualification (Europe)
 2023 FIBA Basketball World Cup qualification
 2023 FIBA Basketball World Cup

References

External links

Italy Qualifiers Profile at the FIBA Website

2021
2022
2023 FIBA Basketball World Cup